The MTV Video Music Award for Most Experimental Video was first awarded in 1984. The last of this award was given out in 1987, after which it was replaced with Breakthrough Video the following year.

During the category's brief existence, several directors were nominated for multiple videos, including Daniel Kleinman (5 nominations), Steve Barron (3 nominations with 1 win), Godley & Creme (2 nominations with 1 win), and Mary Lambert (2 nominations).

Recipients

References

MTV Video Music Awards
Awards established in 1984
Awards disestablished in 1987